North Okanagan was the name of a provincial electoral district in the Canadian province of British Columbia beginning with the election of 1916.  Following the 1975 election boundary revisions accompanied the riding's renaming to Okanagan North.  The riding was originally part of the Yale riding until 1890, and when first that riding was broken up the Okanagan was in Yale-East (1894–1900), and then in Okanagan (1903–1912).  Both North Okanagan and South Okanagan were created in advance of the 1916 election.

Notable MLAs
Price Ellison
Kenneth Cattanach MacDonald, 1916–1928, 1933-1945 (d. in office), Liberal
Lorne Shantz - Social Credit
Patricia Jordan

Political geography

Election results 
Note: Winners of each election are in bold.

|-

|Liberal
|Kenneth Cattanach MacDonald
|align="right"|1,261
|align="right"|57.08%
|align="right"|
|align="right"|unknown
|- bgcolor="white"
!align="right" colspan=3|Total valid votes
!align="right"|2,209 
!align="right"|100.00%
!align="right"|
|- bgcolor="white"
!align="right" colspan=3|Total rejected ballots
!align="right"|
!align="right"|
!align="right"|
|- bgcolor="white"
!align="right" colspan=3|Turnout
!align="right"|%
!align="right"|
!align="right"|
|}
   	  	  	  	 

  	  	  	  	 

|Liberal
|Kenneth Cattanach MacDonald
|align="right"|1,362
|align="right"|33.20%
|- bgcolor="white"
!align="right" colspan=3|Total valid votes
!align="right"|4,103 
!align="right"|100.00%
	  	  	  	  	  	 
 	 	  	 

 	  	  	  	 

|-

|Co-operative Commonwealth Fed.
|Stephen Freeman
|align="right"|868 		
|align="right"|17.95%
|align="right"|
|align="right"|unknown

|Liberal
|Kenneth Cattanach MacDonald
|align="right"|2,322
|align="right"|48.01%
|align="right"|
|align="right"|unknown
|- bgcolor="white"
!align="right" colspan=3|Total valid votes
!align="right"|4,836 	
!align="right"|100.00%
!align="right"|
|- bgcolor="white"
!align="right" colspan=3|Total rejected ballots
!align="right"|46
!align="right"|
!align="right"|
|- bgcolor="white"
!align="right" colspan=3|Turnout
!align="right"|%
!align="right"|
!align="right"|
|} 	  	  	  	 
  	  	  	  	 	  	  	 

|-

|Co-operative Commonwealth Fed.
|Stephen Freeman
|align="right"|700 			
|align="right"|13.70%
|align="right"|
|align="right"|unknown

|Liberal
|Kenneth Cattanach MacDonald
|align="right"|2,689
|align="right"|52.64%
|align="right"|
|align="right"|unknown
|- bgcolor="white"
!align="right" colspan=3|Total valid votes
!align="right"|5,108  
!align="right"|100.00%
!align="right"|
|- bgcolor="white"
!align="right" colspan=3|Total rejected ballots
!align="right"|81
!align="right"|
!align="right"|
|- bgcolor="white"
!align="right" colspan=3|Turnout
!align="right"|%
!align="right"|
!align="right"|
|} 	
  	  	  	  	 

|-

|Co-operative Commonwealth Fed.
|Gordon Daniel Herbert
|align="right"|1,071 	 		
|align="right"|18.16%
|align="right"|
|align="right"|unknown

|Liberal
|Kenneth Cattanach MacDonald
|align="right"|2,508
|align="right"|42.52%
|align="right"|
|align="right"|unknown
|- bgcolor="white"
!align="right" colspan=3|Total valid votes
!align="right"|5,899 	
!align="right"|100.00%
!align="right"|
|- bgcolor="white"
!align="right" colspan=3|Total rejected ballots
!align="right"|79
!align="right"|
!align="right"|
|- bgcolor="white"
!align="right" colspan=3|Turnout
!align="right"|%
!align="right"|
!align="right"|
|}

  	  	  	  	 

|-

|Co-operative Commonwealth Fed.
|Leonard Warner Wood
|align="right"|1,582 			
|align="right"|31.63%
|align="right"|
|align="right"|unknown
|- bgcolor="white"
!align="right" colspan=3|Total valid votes
!align="right"|5,002 
!align="right"|100.00%
!align="right"|
|- bgcolor="white"
!align="right" colspan=3|Total rejected ballots
!align="right"|102
!align="right"|
!align="right"|
|- bgcolor="white"
!align="right" colspan=3|Turnout
!align="right"|%
!align="right"|
!align="right"|
|- bgcolor="white"
!align="right" colspan=7|7 Died after the election and before the opening of the new legislature.
|}
  	  	  	  	   	  	 	  	  	   	 

|-

|Co-operative Commonwealth Fed.
|William Alfred Monk
|align="right"|2,657 	 	 		
|align="right"|32.61%
|align="right"|
|align="right"|unknown

|Social Credit
|Lorne Shantz
|align="right"|525 		 		
|align="right"|6.44%
|align="right"|
|align="right"|unknown
|- bgcolor="white"
!align="right" colspan=3|Total valid votes
!align="right"|8,148
!align="right"|100.00%
!align="right"|
|- bgcolor="white"
!align="right" colspan=3|Total rejected ballots
!align="right"|190
!align="right"|
!align="right"|
|- bgcolor="white"
!align="right" colspan=3|Turnout
!align="right"|%
!align="right"|
!align="right"|
|}

|-

|Progressive Conservative
|David Fremont Buell Kinloch
|align="right"|1,240              
|align="right"|13.08%
|align="right"| - 
|align="right"| -.- %
|align="right"|
|align="right"|unknown

|Co-operative Commonwealth Fed.
|William Alfred Monk
|align="right"|1,786                       
|align="right"|18.85% 
|align="right"| -   
|align="right"| -.- %
|align="right"|
|align="right"|unknown

|Liberal
|Charles William Morrow
|align="right"|2,104           
|align="right"|22.20%
|align="right"|3,063  	 	
|align="right"|35.99%
|align="right"|
|align="right"|unknown

|- bgcolor="white"
!align="right" colspan=3|Total valid votes
!align="right"|9,477       
!align="right"|100.00%
!align="right"|8,510 
!align="right"|%
!align="right"|
|- bgcolor="white"
!align="right" colspan=3|Total rejected ballots
!align="right"|392
!align="right"|
!align="right"|
|- bgcolor="white"
!align="right" colspan=3|Turnout
!align="right"|%
!align="right"|
!align="right"|
|- bgcolor="white"
!align="right" colspan=9|8 Preferential ballot; final count is between top two candidates from first count; first and final of three (3) counts shown only.
|}	  	 	 
 	  	  	  	  	   	  	  	 	  	  	 

|-

|Progressive Conservative
|Neville Ross Patrick Duke
|align="right"|700 	 		 	                     
|align="right"|7.77% 
|align="right"| - 
|align="right"| -.- %
|align="right"|
|align="right"|unknown

|Co-operative Commonwealth Fed.
|Bruce Edward Emerson  	 	 	
|align="right"|1,749 	 	 	 	 		 	       
|align="right"|19.42% 
|align="right"|1,868  
|align="right"|21.10%
|align="right"|
|align="right"|unknown

|Liberal
|Franklyn Valair
|align="right"|2,071 	 	 	 	 				 	 	     
|align="right"|22.99% 
|align="right"|2,407 
|align="right"|27.19% 
|align="right"|
|align="right"|unknown
|- bgcolor="white"
!align="right" colspan=3|Total valid votes
!align="right"|9,008 	  		  		   	  	       
!align="right"|100.00%
!align="right"|8,853 
!align="right"|%
!align="right"|
|- bgcolor="white"
!align="right" colspan=3|Total rejected ballots
!align="right"|477
!align="right"|
!align="right"|
!align="right"|
!align="right"|
|- bgcolor="white"
!align="right" colspan=3|Total Registered Voters
!align="right"|
!align="right"|
!align="right"|
!align="right"|
!align="right"|
|- bgcolor="white"
!align="right" colspan=3|Turnout
!align="right"|%
!align="right"|
!align="right"|
!align="right"|
!align="right"|
|- bgcolor="white"
!align="right" colspan=9|9  Preferential ballot; final count is between top two candidates from first count; intermediary counts (of 3) not shown.
|}
  	  	  	  	  	  	  	  	  	  	  	   	 

|-

|Liberal
|John A. Davis
|align="right"|2,272 		          
|align="right"|27.14%
|align="right"|
|align="right"|unknown

|Co-operative Commonwealth Fed.
|William Alfred Monk
|align="right"|1,429 	 	
|align="right"|17.07%
|align="right"|
|align="right"|unknown

|- bgcolor="white"
!align="right" colspan=3|Total valid votes
!align="right"|8,372   
!align="right"|100.00%
!align="right"|
|- bgcolor="white"
!align="right" colspan=3|Total rejected ballots
!align="right"|184
!align="right"|
!align="right"|
|- bgcolor="white"
!align="right" colspan=3|Turnout
!align="right"|%
!align="right"|
!align="right"|
|}
  	  	  	  	   	  	   	 

|-

|Liberal
|John A. Davis
|align="right"|1,817 			          
|align="right"|17.16%
|align="right"|
|align="right"|unknown

|Progressive Conservative
|John M. Kosty
|align="right"|1,098 	 	 		 	                     
|align="right"|10.37% 
|align="right"|
|align="right"|unknown

|Co-operative Commonwealth Fed.
|Isabella Pothecary 10
|align="right"|3,028 		 	
|align="right"|28.60%
|align="right"|
|align="right"|unknown

|- bgcolor="white"
!align="right" colspan=3|Total valid votes
!align="right"|10,587 
!align="right"|100.00%
!align="right"|
|- bgcolor="white"
!align="right" colspan=3|Total rejected ballots
!align="right"|118
!align="right"|
!align="right"|
|- bgcolor="white"
!align="right" colspan=3|Turnout
!align="right"|%
!align="right"|
!align="right"|
|- bgcolor="white"
!align="right" colspan=7|10  In 1963 Statement of Votes listed as Isobel.
|}
  	  	  	  	  	  	  	  	  	 

|-

|Liberal
|Frank F. Becker
|align="right"|2,076 	 	
|align="right"|20.75%
|align="right"|
|align="right"|unknown

|Progressive Conservative
|Harry W. Byatt
|align="right"|1,765 	 		 	
|align="right"|17.64%
|align="right"|
|align="right"|unknown

|- bgcolor="white"
!align="right" colspan=3|Total valid votes
!align="right"|10,006
!align="right"|100.00%
!align="right"|
|- bgcolor="white"
!align="right" colspan=3|Total rejected ballots
!align="right"|69
!align="right"|
!align="right"|
|- bgcolor="white"
!align="right" colspan=3|Turnout
!align="right"|%
!align="right"|
!align="right"|
|}	  	  	  
  	  	  	  	   	 

|-

|Liberal
|Frank F. Becker
|align="right"|2,408 		 	 	
|align="right"|30.46%
|align="right"|
|align="right"|unknown

|Independent
|Ellwood Charles Rice
|align="right"|121
|align="right"|19.42%
|align="right"|
|align="right"|unknown
|- bgcolor="white"
!align="right" colspan=3|Total valid votes
!align="right"|7,905 	 	
!align="right"|100.00%
!align="right"|
|- bgcolor="white"
!align="right" colspan=3|Total rejected ballots
!align="right"|63
!align="right"|
!align="right"|
|- bgcolor="white"
!align="right" colspan=3|Turnout
!align="right"|%
!align="right"|
!align="right"|
|}  	  	  	 
  	  	  	  	   	  	  	   	  	 

|-

|Liberal
|Robert Richard Neil
|align="right"|2,127 	 		 	
|align="right"|19.31%
|align="right"|
|align="right"|unknown

|- bgcolor="white"
!align="right" colspan=3|Total valid votes
!align="right"|11,015 	
!align="right"|100.00%
!align="right"|
|- bgcolor="white"
!align="right" colspan=3|Total rejected ballots
!align="right"|103
!align="right"|
!align="right"|
|- bgcolor="white"
!align="right" colspan=3|Turnout
!align="right"|%
!align="right"|
!align="right"|
|}  	
  	  	  	  	 

|-

|Liberal
|Kenneth Leyden Christensen
|align="right"|2,960 		 	 	
|align="right"|20.81%
|align="right"|
|align="right"|unknown

|Progressive Conservative
|Brian George Usher
|align="right"|2,080 		 		 	
|align="right"|14.63%
|align="right"|
|align="right"|unknown

|- bgcolor="white"
!align="right" colspan=3|Total valid votes
!align="right"|14,222 		
!align="right"|100.00%
!align="right"|
|- bgcolor="white"
!align="right" colspan=3|Total rejected ballots
!align="right"|118
!align="right"|
!align="right"|
|- bgcolor="white"
!align="right" colspan=3|Turnout
!align="right"|%
!align="right"|
!align="right"|
|}  		

|-

|Liberal
|Daniel Gaetano DeGirolamo
|align="right"|2,305 	 	 	 	 	
|align="right"|12.32%
|align="right"|
|align="right"|unknown

|- bgcolor="white"
!align="right" colspan=3|Total valid votes
!align="right"|18,715 
!align="right"|100.00%
!align="right"|
|- bgcolor="white"
!align="right" colspan=3|Total rejected ballots
!align="right"|165
!align="right"|
!align="right"|
|- bgcolor="white"
!align="right" colspan=3|Turnout
!align="right"|%
!align="right"|
!align="right"|
|} 
   	 
Redistribution of the riding following the 1975 election saw adjustments of its boundaries and a new name, Okanagan North.

External links 
Elections BC website - historical election data

Former provincial electoral districts of British Columbia